Jiří Rohan (born 13 December 1964 in Prague) is a Czechoslovak-Czech slalom canoeist who competed in the 1980s and 1990s. Competing in two Summer Olympics, he won two silver medals in the C2 event, earning them in 1992 and 1996.

Rohan also won a complete set of medals in the C2 event at the ICF Canoe Slalom World Championships with a gold in 1993, a silver in 1991, and a bronze in 1997. He earned seven other medals in the C2 team event (3 golds and 4 silvers).

He won the overall World Cup title in the C2 category six consecutive times between 1990 and 1995. He has also won a silver medal in the C2 event at the 1996 European Championships.

His partner in the boat during most of his active career was Miroslav Šimek.

World Cup individual podiums

References

1964 births
Canoeists at the 1992 Summer Olympics
Canoeists at the 1996 Summer Olympics
Czech male canoeists
Czechoslovak male canoeists
Living people
Olympic canoeists of Czechoslovakia
Olympic canoeists of the Czech Republic
Olympic silver medalists for Czechoslovakia
Olympic silver medalists for the Czech Republic
Olympic medalists in canoeing
Medalists at the 1996 Summer Olympics
Medalists at the 1992 Summer Olympics
Medalists at the ICF Canoe Slalom World Championships
Canoeists from Prague